A taco salad is a Tex-Mex dish that combines ingredients used in  Tex-Mex tacos. The dish originated in Texas during the 1960s.

Ingredients
The salad is served with a fried flour tortilla shell stuffed with shredded iceberg lettuce and topped with diced tomatoes, shredded Cheddar cheese, sour cream, guacamole, and salsa.  The salad is topped with taco meat (ground beef), seasoned shredded chicken or beans and/or Spanish rice for vegetarians.

See also
 Frito pie
 Haystacks
 List of salads
 Tostada

References

Salads
Tex-Mex cuisine
Taco